Culicoides monicae is a species of Culicoides.

References

monicae
Insects described in 2004